Midstream was a magazine established by the New York-based Theodor Herzl Foundation, which was associated with the American Section of the World Zionist Organization. Described as an "intellectual Zionist journal". It to a significant degree was a saw itself as playing a role somewhat similar to that of Commentary, an intellectual publication of the American Jewish Committee, but with an explicitly Jewish focus. Midstream began publication in 1955. Started as a Quarterly Jewish Review, it became a monthly in 1965. Its final print edition was in 2013.

Midstream was a journal of opinion, focusing on political, social and religious topics related to Jewish communities. While it was not the official organ per se of the Foundation, it was established, at a time when a range of similar publications were being printed, such as Partisan Review, The Reconstructionist, and even The New Republic, as a means for expression of a wide range of opinions within political Zionism, not necessarily reflecting the views of the magazine's editors. <ref>"What is Midstream's point of view.(Editorial)", Midstream, January 1, 2007</ref>Midstream to a significant degree followed the basic political arc of Commentary'' from liberal to center-of-the-road to somewhat conservative to neoconservative, reflecting the views of a succession of editors, although it was not the same arc of the majority of American Jewry.

References

Monthly magazines published in the United States
Political magazines published in the United States
Quarterly magazines published in the United States
Jewish magazines published in the United States
Jews and Judaism in New York (state)
Magazines established in 1955
Magazines published in New York (state)
Zionism in the United States
1955 establishments in New York (state)